CJSS-TV was a television station in Cornwall, Ontario, Canada. In operation from 1959 to 1963 as a private affiliate of CBC Television, the station was later converted to a rebroadcaster of Ottawa's CJOH-TV.

The station originally signed on as a CBC Television affiliate on October 18, 1959, owned by Stanley Shenkman. Shenkman also acquired the radio stations CKSF and CKSF-FM, which both adopted the CJSS call sign as well.

In 1963, CJSS was acquired by Ernie Bushnell and converted into a rebroadcaster of Ottawa's CTV affiliate CJOH, making CJSS the first TV station in Canada ever to cease operations as its own station and become a repeater for another. After many years of use to rimshot the Montréal market, Bell Media took the station permanently dark in 2017. The radio stations were sold to a local family, and subsequently broadcast as part of Corus Entertainment. Of these stations, 1220 AM (as CJUL) left the air August 18, 2010 leaving just CJSS-FM retaining the original call sign.

References

External links 
 The Brisson Brothers star on their own TV series "The Town & Country Show" on CJSS-TV in Cornwall, (Ottawa Country Music Hall of Fame, 1994).
 237 Water Street East, former home of CJSS radio; in the late 1950s and early 1960s, this building served as the studios for short-lived CJSS-TV 8.
 

JSS
JSS
Television channels and stations established in 1959
Television channels and stations disestablished in 1963
Mass media in Cornwall, Ontario
1959 establishments in Ontario
1963 disestablishments in Ontario
JSS-TV